The Ninth Guest, sometimes abbreviated as The 9th Guest, is a 1934 American pre-Code murder mystery film directed by Roy William Neill and starring Donald Cook and Genevieve Tobin.

The film is an adaptation of the 1930 Broadway play The Ninth Guest by Owen Davis, which in turn is based on the 1930 novel, The Invisible Host, by Bruce Manning and Gwen Bristow. The book, play and film all predate Agatha Christie's extremely successful 1939 novel And Then There Were None, which has a similar plot.

Plot

Eight guests at a deadly party are informed by the voice of their unknown host from the radio that they are his enemies, and will all meet his ninth guest: Death.

Cast
 Donald Cook as James Daley
 Genevieve Tobin as Jean Trent
 Hardie Albright as Henry Abbott
 Edward Ellis as Tim Cronin
 Edwin Maxwell as Jason Osgood
 Helen Flint as Sylvia Inglesby
 Samuel Hinds as Dr. Murray Reid
 Nella Walker as Margaret Chisholm
 Vince Barnett as Butler (Jones)
 Sidney Bracey as Butler (Hawkins; credited as Sidney Bracy)

External links

American crime drama films
American mystery drama films
American black-and-white films
Columbia Pictures films
Films based on American novels
American films based on plays
Films directed by Roy William Neill
Films set in New Orleans
1930s mystery drama films
1934 crime drama films
1934 films
1930s American films